Richard Edward Hart also known as Dick Hart (born October 5, 1952) is an American former professional ice hockey defenseman.

During the 1976–77 season, Hart played four games in the World Hockey Association with the Birmingham Bulls.

References

External links

1952 births
Living people
American men's ice hockey defensemen
Beauce Jaros players
Birmingham Bulls players
Boston College Eagles men's ice hockey players
Charlotte Checkers (SHL) players
Columbus Owls players
Dayton Gems players
Providence Reds players
Rochester Americans players
San Diego Mariners players
Winston-Salem Polar Twins (SHL) players
Ice hockey people from Boston